Maxima is a character appearing in comics published by DC Comics. In her original incarnation, she was a morally ambiguous queen from the planet Almerac who is known for searching for mates among Earth's superhuman male population to be wedded as her king, and became obsessed with Superman for a time. She has also worked as a superheroine member of the Justice League. In her recent incarnations, she is reintroduced as a princess of Almerac and ally of Supergirl. Unlike her previous version, she is gay and struggles with following Almerac's traditions in continuing the royal line with finding a male mate.

Publication history
Maxima first appeared in Action Comics #645 (September 1989) and was created by writer Roger Stern and artist George Pérez.

Fictional character biography

Post-Crisis
The oldest child of the royal family of the planet Almerac, the fiery-tempered Maxima came to Earth in search of a suitable mate to sire her heir, leaving behind Ultraa, her betrothed. Maxima's first appearance in Metropolis was not actually her but a simulacrum of her brought to Earth by her servant Sazu, who took it upon herself to convince Superman to be her mate. The simulacrum was destroyed and Sazu was imprisoned. The real Maxima then appeared to free Sazu and came face to face with Superman. She and Superman, she argued, were genetically compatible; she could "give him what no Earth woman could - children". She was infuriated when Superman rejected her offer, saying he had no desire to father despots.

Maxima later found herself reluctantly working with Brainiac who had destroyed Almerac with the Warworld. She turned against him, and helped Earth's heroes defeat him, subsequently joining a reformed Justice League for her own reasons. When the League helped her save Almerac from Starbreaker, the planet's ruling council exiled her. As a Leaguer, she helped in the fight against Doomsday, and when that version of the League disbanded, she became a member of Captain Atom's Extreme Justice team. She considered Captain Atom as a potential mate, but he was not interested. During the period of her flirtation with Captain Atom, a jilted Ultraa angrily attacked him. Maxima eventually stopped the brawl and sent Ultraa back to Almerac. She later had a brief fling with another teammate, Amazing-Man, which lasted until the team was dissolved. While part of the Extreme Justice team, she joined with other heroes on a trip to Hell itself, mistakenly believing that Superman was trapped there. During the battle, Maxima fell and was lost in one of the 'nine rings'. She was sent back to Earth when Neron, the current ruler of Hell, was subdued.

She offered herself sexually to Superman again, hoping that her recent good deeds would offset her earlier ruthlessness. Superman, now married to Lois Lane, was even less interested in her proposal than before. Angry and humiliated, she joined the Superman Revenge Squad. She swore that Superman had rejected, humbled and humiliated her for the last time, and threatened that the next time they meet, it would truly be war.

In her next appearance, during the buildup to the "Our Worlds at War" crossover, Maxima and the "Chosen People of Almerac", as she phrased it, showed up in Earth's Solar System where they met up with Superman and fellow JLA member, Green Lantern. Superman and Green Lantern were just beginning to investigate the disturbing disappearance of Pluto and the even more distressing ion engine trail associated with Warworld, when they stumbled across Maxima, her people, and the supervillain Massacre.

After a battle full of wounded pride, Maxima eventually conceded her position when Almerac's rendezvous showed up using a Boom Tube. She explained that she was leading her people to safety from Imperiex, the force that conquered her world. Massacre had seemed to meet his death; however, somehow Maxima came across him and described her association in these words: "Massacre serves only me now". To save her people, she allied herself with Darkseid's son, Grayven, who was taking them to regions unknown. This was also being undertaken without the knowledge of Darkseid. Maxima left Superman with the following words: "Mark my words, when Imperiex comes for your precious homeworld, you'll see alliances you've never dreamed of".

All that Maxima warned eventually came to fruition as she and a myriad of other characters (both heroes and villains) formed alliances with Earth and Apokolips in an effort to destroy Imperiex.

Maxima ultimately met her demise in a heroic effort to put her ship between the destructive beams of Brainiac 13's Warworld which would have resulted in the destruction of the entire universe, making amends with Superman prior to after he had rescued her despite her animosity over his constant rejection of her.

The New 52
In 2011, The New 52 rebooted the DC Universe. A younger, revamped Maxima is briefly introduced in Supergirl #36 as a distinguished member of the Crucible Academy, an intergalactic organization that trains some planets' finest specimens to become their planets' protectors. She spends the next few issues bonding with Kara before eventually revealing in issue #40 that she is emotionally and sexually attracted to Kara. Maxima's homosexuality is the reason she left her home world and the demands of her culture to find an opposite-sex partner to produce children with. Additionally, "Maxima" is revealed to be a title rather than simply a name.

DC Rebirth

Superwoman
An older woman who resembles the more traditional Pre-Flashpoint version of the character in both appearance and personality briefly appeared as a villain and usurped the title. This version was a former Almeracian soldier serving the true Maxima's mother who was disappointed with the younger Maxima's reluctance in finding a male mate on account of her homosexuality. Believing her unworthy of the Maxima title and her royal heritage, the usuper would kidnap the younger woman and attempt to take her place. The older impostor was eventually defeated and imprisoned by the combined might of Supergirl, Superwoman and the real Maxima.

Personality and motivations
Overall, the portrayal of Maxima varied by writer. In her appearances in the various Superman titles, Maxima was typically depicted as a haughty and shallow individual with only self-centered motivations, lacking any real depth as a character. By contrast, in her appearances in the comic book series Extreme Justice and Steel, Maxima was developed as an individual with a warrior's sense of honor and a strong countenance of noble pride that had its humorous moments in relation to other characters. This was evident during Extreme Justice #10 and #11, where Maxima hosted the bachelorette party for Captain Atom's fiancée, Plastique, wearing a stylish and elegant "red carpet" dress while everyone else wore jeans to the event that was held in the party room of a humble Tex-Mex restaurant. This occurred again in later issues of that series, where she is visibly uncomfortable from seeing newly joined members, Zan and Jayna, gorge themselves on junk food at a mall food court.

Powers and abilities
As a scion of the Blood Royale of Almerac, Maxima commands a vast array of immense psionic powers that come from selective breeding and years of gene therapy which she can utilize in a variety of ways. In her first face to face encounter with Superman she displayed a high level of psionic powers, such as psychokinesis and seemingly hypnotic mind control. Maxima can use her psionic powers to give herself superhuman strength, enough to prove an effective opponent in hand-to-hand combat with a resurrected Superman or hold her own against the even stronger Doomsday. Maxima can increase her strength to an unlimited degree, pushing her past those in her tier. She also has enhanced stamina, as well as having such a degree of superhuman speed that she could easily move faster than the speed of light and proven herself to be able to keep up with speedsters such as the Flash. Through skillful application of her psionic powers, Maxima has been shown to emit powerful optical beams that can severely injure even Superman, take out Orion with one bolt, and she can create nearly impervious force fields. She is also capable of teleporting herself and others across vast distances, even from other worlds, which was demonstrated when she brought her adviser Sazu to Earth from a prison world. In the first battle with Doomsday in The Adventures of Superman #498, Maxima is the only one in that incarnation of the Justice League besides Superman who was able to actually hurt and withstand blows from Doomsday. Her various abilities and powers make her a threat potentially for the entire Justice League.

Other versions
An alternate history where Superman marries Maxima after Lois dies was presented as an Elseworlds story that was part of the Armageddon 2001 crossover in which Waverider looked at possible futures of DC characters. In this scenario, Superman is overcome with grief from the death of his wife Lois Lane, after their unborn child causes her death from internal bleeding when it kicks in her womb. Apparently, even a half-Kryptonian child was too much for a normal Earth woman to bear. Blaming himself and grief-stricken, Superman exiles himself from Earth once again, and is ready to die in space when he comes across one of the many enemies of Almerac. He is saved by Maxima, who at this time is unwillingly engaged to the Krenon cyborg De'Cine. Following on the advice of her handmaiden Sazu, she pretends to become more tactful and 'nice' to win Superman's heart, but in the process, she truly falls in love with him. At the end, she and Superman leave Earth forever to protect it from a potential reprisal from the Krenon Empire after the death of De'Cine. As they leave, Maxima remarks what fine children they would have.

In other media

Television

 A character similar to Maxima called Neila appears in Superboy, portrayed by Christine Moore. This version has the powers of pyrokinesis, minor shapeshifting capabilities limited to her hair, and teleportation. In her self-titled episode, she comes to Earth to challenge Superboy and test his worthiness to be her husband so she can find a strong king for her people. Their subsequent battle ends in a draw and him rejecting her advances because of his commitment to Earth and her superior-minded personality. After noticing the feelings between Superboy and Lana Lang, Neila disguises herself as an ordinary woman and meets with Lang to learn more about her. When Lang proves willing to sacrifice herself so that Superboy does not have to hold back, a moved Neila admits she had underestimated the strength of ordinary people and returns to her home planet. In "Neila and the Beast", Neila returns to ask for Superboy's help due to rebels on her planet assassinating the royal family using weapons capable of harming them and because she is being pursued by a Sasquatch-like creature with strength rivaling theirs. After several battles with the creature, Superboy eventually learns it is an incorporeal alien that inhabits dead bodies, had fallen in love with Neila, and sought to win her over with strength and ferocity. Meanwhile, Neila goes on a date with a seemingly ordinary man who reveals himself as a rebel assassin sent to kill her. Superboy and the creature kill the assassin, but the latter's body is irreparably damaged. Superboy convinces the alien to inhabit the assassin's body and Neila falls in love with him.
 Maxima appears in the Superman: The Animated Series episode "Warrior Queen", voiced by Sharon Lawrence. This version sports a whimsical personality, superhuman strength and durability, metallokinesis, and a bracelet that allows her to teleport. She pursues and kidnaps Superman as a potential mate, but ends up being deposed by her subjects due to her being self-absorbed and neglecting her leadership responsibilities. While working with Superman to reclaim her throne, she gradually comes to learn of consent of the governed and that she should serve her people. In return, she allows Superman to return home before encountering Lobo.
 Maxima appears in the Smallville episode "Instinct", portrayed by Charlotte Sullivan. This version possesses superhuman strength, speed, and invulnerability, mind control, a toxic kiss, and empathic powers. After her planet receives a signal from a Kryptonian device, she travels to Earth to find a Kryptonian mate. During her search, she kills several human males with her kiss until she finds Clark Kent, whose physiology registers arousal in her. Amidst a violent confrontation, she senses the love between Kent and Lois Lane, but refuses to give up her quest until Kent triggers her teleportation bracelet to send her home.
 Maxima appears in the Supergirl episode "Myriad", portrayed by Eve Torres Gracie. This version came to Earth to make Superman her mate, but was thwarted and incarcerated by the Department of Extranormal Operations (DEO).

Film
Maxima makes a non-speaking appearance in DC Super Hero Girls: Intergalactic Games as a student of Korugar Academy.

Miscellaneous
Maxima appears in DC Super Hero Girls as a student of the Korugar Academy.

See also
 List of Superman enemies

References

Comics characters introduced in 1989
DC Comics aliens
DC Comics characters who can move at superhuman speeds
DC Comics characters who can teleport 
DC Comics characters with superhuman strength
DC Comics extraterrestrial superheroes
DC Comics extraterrestrial supervillains
DC Comics female superheroes
DC Comics female supervillains
DC Comics LGBT superheroes
DC Comics LGBT supervillains 
DC Comics characters who have mental powers
DC Comics telekinetics 
DC Comics telepaths
Fictional LGBT women
Fictional characters who can duplicate themselves
Fictional characters with energy-manipulation abilities
Fictional characters with superhuman durability or invulnerability
Fictional empaths
Fictional queens
Characters created by Roger Stern
Characters created by George Pérez